Qiance, i.e., qiǎncè (Chinese traditional: 遣冊; Chinese simplified: 遣册), is a Chinese archaeological term for a type of excavated document—funerary-furnishing inventory lists. They were usually written on bamboo and wooden slips. According to Professor Qiu Xigui of Fudan University, most of the bamboo and wooden slips unearthed from ancient tombs and the frontier fortress sites in China are ancient books and qiance. It is also argued that qiance, together with the other tomb objects, is to guarantee the tomb owner's social status in the world beyond. According to archaeological discoveries and ancient textual evidence, scholars believe that shorter funerary inventory lists, usually with less than one hundred item names, were written on fengfang, a wooden tablet instead.

References

Orphaned articles from July 2021
Archaeological terminology